Suceava Plateau is a geographic area in the NE Romania (parts of Suceava, Botoșani, Iași, and Neamț counties), and SW Ukraine (parts of Chernivtsi Oblast). Suceava Plateau is the NW part of the Moldavian Plateau. It has altitudes that exceed 700 m and long ridges, such as:

 Fălticeni Plateau (also known as Ciungi Hills), 
 Dragomirnei Plateau (also known as Dragomirnei Hills), 
 Siret Ridge; which itself contains Bour Hills, Șaua Bucecii/Bucecii Saddle, Dealul Mare/The Big Hill, and Șaua Ruginoasa/Ruginoasa Saddle, 
 Ibănești Hills, 
 Conzancea Hills,
 Prut Hills or Prut Ridge, which contain the famous Cosmin Forest 
 Ceremuș Hills 

In the Valley of the River Suceava, a hillock depression, the Rădăuți Depression is situated. In the upper part of the Valley of the River Siret, another hillock depression, the Storojineț Depression is situated. 

Plateaus of Romania
Plateaus of Ukraine
Geography of Chernivtsi Oblast